Vincent Ryan (born 25 October 1935) was an Irish footballer. Son of a founder member of Home Farm (Hamilton Ryan), Ryan played as forward for Home Farm, Celtic and St Mirren. Ryan married Sylvia Cerasi in 1975 and had two sons Conor and Robert Ryan.

Early years

As a schoolboy Ryan played football for Home Farm. He was spotted by Billy Behan. Matt Busby called at his home to sign the young Ryan but negotiations failed and Ryan went on to sign for Celtic a year later for a fee of one thousand pounds. Busby went on to sign Ryan's teammate Liam (Billy) Whelan.

References

External links
 Home Farm F.C.
 Celtic F.C.
 Photo

Two Celtic 'Pros' from The Vincentian Era - (links to Celtic News)

1935 births
Living people
Association footballers from County Dublin
Republic of Ireland association footballers
Home Farm F.C. players
Celtic F.C. players
St Mirren F.C. players
Drumcondra F.C. players
Association football forwards